Singamparai is a village in Mukkudal Town Panchayat, situated just north of Mukkudal in Tirunelveli District, Tamil Nadu, India, with the  Population about 5000 live in the village.

History
The village has the history about 200 years. The people who had adopted the Christianity came from the village Somanthamperi. They Bought lands from the land-lords of pettai and settled down here. They built a church in 1929 dedicated to St. paul the apostle.

Churches and Parish
The church of St. Paul the apostle is the biggest church of the village and it became a Catholic parish church in 1931, separated from Sendamaram parish and its first parish priest was Fr. A. Couturier S.J. In 2013, Thalarkulam became a new parish and separated from singamparai parish. Now the parish area covered includes the villages Mylapuram, Ilanthaikulam, Mukkudal, Pappakudi and Ariyanayagipuram.

There is also a Latin Church of St. Antony of Padua, and another church in the village.

Grottoes
There are grottoes around the village for St. Antony of Paduva, Our Lady of Perpetual Help, Annai Velankanni and Archangel St. Michael.

Schools
R.C.Primary School and St.Paul Hr. Sec. School are the two schools in the village run by the Roman Catholic Diocese of Palayamkottai and managed by the parish priest.

References

Villages in Tirunelveli district